What's Up, Doc? may refer to:

Uses related to Bugs Bunny
 "What's up, doc?", a catchphrase used by Bugs Bunny
 What's Up, Doc? (1950 film), an animated cartoon short
 What's Up Doc? (Australian TV series), a 1990s children's program featuring Looney Tunes cartoons
 What's Up Doc? (British TV series), a 1990s Saturday-morning children's program featuring Looney Tunes cartoons

Other film and television
 What's Up, Doc? (1972 film), a screwball comedy film starring Barbra Streisand and Ryan O'Neal
 "What's Up, Doc?" (Cheers), an episode
 "What's Up Doc?", an episode of Family Matters
 "What's Up, Doc?", an episode of M*A*S*H

Other uses
 "What's Up Doc? (Can We Rock)", a song by Fu-Schnickens, featuring Shaquille O'Neal
 What's Up Doc?, a 2010 book by Hilary Jones

See also
 What's up (disambiguation)

1940s neologisms
Comedy catchphrases
Quotations from film
Quotations from animation